Prince William Alexander Frederick Ernest Casimir of the Netherlands, Prince of Orange-Nassau (Dutch: Willem Alexander Frederik Ernst Casimir, Prins der Nederlanden, Prins van Oranje-Nassau; Soestdijk Palace, 21 May 1822 – Brussels, 22 October 1822) was the fourth son of the Prince of Orange, later King William II of the Netherlands and his wife Grand Duchess Anna Pavlovna of Russia.

He was baptized on 18 June 1822 in the Nieuwe Kerk, Amsterdam. However, because he had hydrocephalus, he died the same year. He was buried in the Protestant Church in Brussels until his body was transferred to the Royal Crypt in the Nieuwe Kerk, Delft, in 1860.

1822 births
1822 deaths
Dutch members of the Dutch Reformed Church
House of Orange-Nassau
Burials in the Royal Crypt at Nieuwe Kerk, Delft
Princes of Orange-Nassau
People from Baarn
People with hydrocephalus
Royalty and nobility with disabilities
Royal reburials
Sons of kings
Royalty and nobility who died as children